Anzoategui is a locality in Caleu Caleu Department, La Pampa Province, Argentina.

Geography of La Pampa Province